Wood River High School is a public secondary school in Hailey, Idaho, one of two traditional high schools operated by the Blaine County School District #61 (the smaller Carey High School (K-12) is the other). Wood River High School serves the communities of Bellevue, Hailey, Ketchum, and Sun Valley, all in the valley of the Big Wood River, and the current campus opened in August 2003. The school colors are green and white and the mascot is a wolverine.

Athletics
Wood River competes in athletics in IHSAA Class 4A, the state's second-highest classification. WRHS is a member of the Great Basin (West) Conference with Burley, Jerome, and Minico High Schools, all located in the Magic Valley region of south central Idaho. Twin Falls High School (formerly 5A) and the new Canyon Ridge High School, both located in Twin Falls, joined the conference in 2009. Formerly a member of the Sawtooth Central Idaho Conference (SCIC) in 3A, Wood River moved up to 4A in 2004. Mountain Home High School will join the Great Basin conference in for the 2016-18 arc.

State titles
Boys

 Cross Country (4): fall  1968, 1971, 1972;  2010 
 Track (2):  1970, 1972
 
 Tennis (2):  2010, 2012 
 Baseball: (3A) 2003
 Hockey (2A): 2007, 2020
 Soccer (4A): 2017

Girls
 Cross Country (3): fall  1975, 1983, 1984 
 Soccer (1): fall  2000 
 Volleyball (2):  fall 1977, 1978 
 

Combined
 Tennis (3):  1982, 1986, 1988 
Debate 2014

References

11.  https://idahoschools.org/schools/0042, IdahoSchools.org, Retrieved 3/5/22.

External links 

Blaine County School District #61
 http://www.sunvalleyonline.com/images/member_images/articles/WRHS042709.2.jpg

Public high schools in Idaho
Schools in Blaine County, Idaho